Ethan Flagg House-Blessed Sacrament Monastery is a historic home and monastery located at Yonkers, Westchester County, New York. It was built in 1855, with additions made in 1922 and in 1954. The house is a two-story, five-bay wide brick building on a rock faced, random ashlar base in the Italianate style.  It has a prominent square cupola and a one-story, wooden porch set on brick piers across the front facade.  The four story, brick monastery building was built in 1922. It has a two-story rear wing with conservatory and includes a former chapel. It features an octagonal cupola and has some cast stone and stucco trim.  The 1954 addition connects the house and monastery building.  The original house was built by industrialist Ethan Flagg (1820-1884), a leading citizen of Yonkers. The property was a residence until its purchase in 1915 by the Sacramentine order of nuns.  The academy closed in 1975 and the nuns relocated to Warwick, New York in 1991.  In 1996, the property was sold for use as a medical and social service center for people with HIV run by the Greyston Foundation.

It was added to the National Register of Historic Places in 1998.

References

External links

Greyston Foundation website

Houses on the National Register of Historic Places in New York (state)
Italianate architecture in New York (state)
Houses completed in 1855
19th-century churches in the United States
Buildings and structures in Yonkers, New York
Houses in Westchester County, New York
National Register of Historic Places in Yonkers, New York
Properties of religious function on the National Register of Historic Places in New York (state)
Italianate church buildings in the United States